Kevin Leahy (born March 21, 1974) is a drummer/percussionist who has recorded and performed with Shawn Mullins, Billy Pilgrim, BoDeans, Jennifer Nettles, Ellis Paul and other American folk rock artists. He studied classical percussion at the Manhattan School of Music and Indiana University School of Music (now Jacobs School of Music), where he was a student of Kenny Aronoff.  While studying at Indiana University, Leahy played in the bands; Flattus Flattus, Fambooey Fambooey, and Hipmotize Hipmotize. He is a member of the band Yonder Orphans.

Discography
Andrew Hyra Spill (1998)
Shawn Mullins Soul's Core (1998)
 Bloodkin Out of State Plates (1999)
Ellis Paul Sweet Mistakes (2001)
Shawn Mullins Essential Shawn Mullins (2003)
 BoDeans Resolution (2004) 
Shawn Mullins 9th Ward Pickin Parlor (2006)

Music videos
Shawn Mullins - Lullaby (1998)
Shawn Mullins - Shimmer (1999)

Gear
Ludwig drums
Vic Firth drum sticks
Zildjian cymbals
Musser marimba & vibraphone

External links
Kevin Leahy's official web site
Kevin Leahy on MySpace
Kevin Leahy's article on Bloomingpedia

1974 births
Living people
Jacobs School of Music alumni
Manhattan School of Music alumni
20th-century American drummers
American male drummers
BoDeans members
21st-century American drummers
20th-century American male musicians
21st-century American male musicians
Place of birth missing (living people)